The Nine Lives of Chloe King is an American supernatural drama television series which premiered on ABC Family on June 14, 2011, and ended on August 16, 2011. The one-hour drama is based on the book series of the same name by Liz Braswell. The series follows Chloe King (Skyler Samuels), a girl who discovers that she is a descendant of an ancient race of Bastet offspring called the Mai, as she attempts to learn more about her cat-like powers with her friends and protectors, while also assuming the role of the "Uniter", a warrior that can stop the war between Mai and humans. Chloe is also bestowed with nine lives and must stay alive while dealing with her love life and the mysteries behind her missing father.

In September 2011, ABC Family announced its cancellation after one season.

Premise
The protagonist, Chloe King, is a teenager who discovers on her sixteenth birthday that she has special cat-like powers, including nine lives, enhanced speed, strength, hearing, agility, night vision and the ability to extend her nails like cat claws, along with the ability to sense human emotions.

When Chloe realizes a mysterious figure is shadowing her, she goes on to uncover that she is a descendant of an ancient race called the Mai. She discovers she has nine lives and is told by Jasmine and Alek that she alone can protect the race from human assassins, who have hunted them for thousands of years.

Characters

Main

 Chloe King (Skyler Samuels) is a descendant of an ancient race called the Mai. She is believed to be the savior of the Mai race, with extra abilities and the gift of nine lives, making her the "Uniter", a warrior in a prophecy that states that she must save the world and both the Mai and Human races, and stop their war. She is originally from Ukraine, but was brought to the United States by the man who became her adoptive father and may have known of her powers.
 Alek Petrov (Benjamin Stone) is one of the descendants of the Mai race and Jasmine's cousin who reveals himself to Chloe to protect her. Alek's parents were killed by part of the order. Alek attempted to kiss Chloe in the first episode, but was stopped by Jasmine before he could. He acts as her protector, and helps keep her from harm. He has a habit of cracking jokes and teasing Chloe about aspects of the Mai's abilities and attributes. Alek eventually ends up falling in love with Chloe. In episode 7, Alek comes to Chloe, tells her that they belong together and kisses her and she kisses him back. Alek goes to Paul and seeks advice on how to woo Chloe. Paul reveals that there is nothing more important to Chloe than her friends. Later, Alek tells Chloe that he wants the duty of Chloe's protector to be removed so that if Chloe ever ends up in trouble he can be there because he wants to, not because he has to. It is revealed in the series finale that Zane is his brother.
 Meredith King (Amy Pietz) is the mother of Chloe King. Her husband found Chloe and decided to adopt her but later left her, making Meredith a single parent.
 Amy Tiffany Martins (Grace Phipps) is one of Chloe's best friends. She started dating Paul, the final member of the trio, in the first episode. They broke up briefly, but soon realized one fight was not enough to keep them apart.
 Paul Chun (Ki Hong Lee) is one of Chloe's best friends and is dating Amy. He is shown to be somewhat of a comic book geek, being very excited when Chloe develops her powers. He is the only one out of Chloe's group of human friends who believe from the beginning that her powers were a gift, not a curse, and demanded to be Chloe's 'sidekick'.
 Jasmine (Alyssa Diaz) is one of the descendants of the Mai race who seeks to protect Chloe, the savior of their race. Her mother Valentina is the leader of the San Francisco Mai. Throughout the first season, Jasmine reveals that she has struggled to earn her mother's approval. In the series finale Jasmine is stabbed by Zane and seemed to be dying next to her mother.
 Brian Rezza (Grey Damon) is a friend and love interest to Chloe and also the son of the man who is attempting to kill Chloe to wipe out the Mai civilization. He is referred to as "kitty hat" by Amy, because Chloe met Brian by selling him a hat with cat ears. Brian and Chloe have a very complicated relationship due to Chloe's inability to "get intimate" with humans, lest the human die or become paralyzed. Brian admits to loving Chloe, but Chloe tells him they are to be "just friends" Brian catches Chloe kissing Alek and becomes angered that she does not return his feelings. He continues to see Chloe as friends, which in turn angers Alek, who does not understand why Chloe still has feelings for Brian. Brian pushes and punches Alek, which deeply angers Chloe, due to her protection of friends. Brian tells her later that he acted so physically because "it was him," meaning that Alek was the one who had first wounded Chloe's and Brian's friendship. In the series finale, it appears that he dies because he kissed Chloe.

Recurring characters
 Valentina (Alicia Coppola) is Jasmine's mother, and the leader of all the Mai in San Francisco. According to Jasmine and Alek, she has killed fifteen members of the Order with her bare hands. She is the subject of Jasmine's frustration, due to her lack of attention towards her daughter. Valentina believes that Chloe must leave behind her human life in order to pursue her destiny, though after Chloe goes out of her way to help her friend and employer against an abusive ex-boyfriend, she states that Chloe is everything she expected of the Uniter and that it may be time for the Mai and the humans to stop living in separate worlds. In the series finale, she is seemed to be killed with a poison dart.
 Whitley Rezza (David S. Lee) is Brian's father, and a member of the Order. Throughout the first season, he proves to have more secrets than anyone Brian has ever known. Brian takes Chloe to an art exhibit with Mr. Rezza in the same room. Brian has no knowledge of his father's work; as well, Mr. Rezza and Brian know nothing about each other's connections to Chloe.
 Simone (Jolene Andersen) is Whitley Rezza's coworker. She seems to be the one who oversees all assassinations the Order makes. Simone also shows an interest in Whitley, which he returns throughout the first season.
 Frank Cabrera (Cristian de la Fuente) is Meredith's boyfriend as well as her employee. Meredith continues to see Frank until episode 9, in which both agree to stop the relationship until they sort out other personal relationships. He has a daughter, Vanessa, as well as an ex-wife.
 Lana Jacobs (Aeriél Miranda) is Chloe's boss at the clothing store where she works.
 The Rogue (Kiko Ellsworth), an assassin who tracks Chloe and attempts to kill her in the first three episodes of the series. He is killed by Valentina.
 Zane (Daniel Sharman), a member of the Order sent to befriend and kill Jasmine and her mother. He also claims to be Alek's brother.

Mai
The Mai are an ancient race of supernatural beings, the mortal descendants of the ancient Egyptian cat goddess Bastet. Chloe learns she is a member of them on her sixteenth birthday.

History
The Mai once acted as defenders and companions of the human race, first as guardians for Egyptian pharaohs. Descendants of the Egyptian cat-goddess Bastet, the part-god, part-human Mai used their cat-like attributes to serve and advise humans. The Mai's role as protectors lasted until the 16th century BC when they were defeated by the Ramesses. The daughter of Ramesses III fell in love with a Mai, but the pharaoh banned their nuptials, so they eloped. When the humans and Mai learned of the union, the Mai boy was apprehended and killed by the Egyptians, causing the divide between the two races to grow deeper. As the Third Intermediate Period of Egypt began, the Mai were shunned from society and an organization called The Order emerged. The Order, a group of human assassins, began hunting the half-god race until they were nearly extinct. The fight between the Mai and the Order forced the Mai into hiding and is said to have been so violent, it is supposedly the cause of some of the world's most famous and bloodiest wars.

The Mai are also mortal enemies of the Jackals, a race descended from the Egyptian jackal-god Anubis. The Jackals are described as being filthy and savage, as well as the dregs of society. Ironically, the Mai display the same racist attitudes towards Jackals as The Order display towards the Mai themselves. According to Alek, every ancient god has offspring but only those two were introduced.

Present day
The Mai have now spread out worldwide, with Mai settlements in such places as New York City, Ukraine, San Francisco, São Paulo, Russia, and Hong Kong. Folklore predicts a "Uniter", a Mai born with nine lives, is the only one who will be able to end the Mai-Human war and restore balance between the two races. When Chloe is pushed from Coit Tower and is killed, but returns to life, her Mai peers Alek and Jasmine conclude she is the Uniter with eight remaining lives.

Characteristics
Because of their cat-like abilities, the Mai were natural protectors of the Egyptians and possess several abilities and gifts, and also several weaknesses. Traits include:
 Enhanced strength, dexterity, speed, and stamina
 Magnified reflexes and agility (allowing Mai to land on their feet after falling great distances)
 Increased healing and resistance to poison
 Heightened senses including hearing and smell
 Improved night vision
 Retractable claws

Any intimate actions between a Mai and a human is harmful to the human, resulting in the human's paralysis or death within a few hours. Only the Uniter can be resurrected, although each death will get more painful as time goes on. In addition to nine lives, the Uniter is also an Empath, able to detect and experience the emotions of humans. Chloe can feel other species' emotions, like the Jackals, but this does not work on the Mai. According to Valentina, all Mai once had this ability.

Episodes

Production
The show is written by Daniel Berendsen and is based on Alloy Entertainment's series of three young-adult books by Elizabeth J. Braswell (originally published under the pen name Celia Thomson). Alloy produced the series.

Promotion
In preparation for the premiere, ABCFamily.com rolled out "The Nine Paths to Chloe King", an online game encouraging users to uncover the secrets of the Mai and find The Uniter in order to unlock exclusive content and enter to win a chance to visit the set. Bloggers, or members of the Circle of Strangers, shared additional clues for the game, and users were encouraged to follow their sites as well as their Twitter feeds with the term #NinePaths.

Reception

Critical response
The series has received mostly positive reviews, gaining a score of 68 out of 100 on Metacritic. Slate reviewer Troy Patterson praises the series, calling it "charming" while also observing that it covers familiar ground. Daily News writer David Hinckley writes "ABC Family wins with mix of teen romance, supernatural powers".

The pilot episode drew over 2million viewers when it debuted in June 2011. The season, and ultimately the series finale had dropped about half of that initial audience, drawing just over 1million viewers.

Awards and nominations

Television film
On January 9, 2012, during the Winter TCA Press Tour, ABC Family's president Michael Riley announced that the network was "on the verge of putting a [television] movie into development". On September 11, 2013, TV Guide revealed that the working title of the movie was The Nine Lives of Chloe King: Salvation, and that while it would not be filmed, Alloy Entertainment would release the script on September 13.

References

External links

2010s American supernatural television series
2010s American teen drama television series
2011 American television series debuts
2011 American television series endings
ABC Family original programming
American action television series
English-language television shows
Egyptian mythology in popular culture
Television series about teenagers
Television series by Alloy Entertainment
Television shows set in San Francisco
Television series by Disney–ABC Domestic Television
Bastet